Maria (18 March 1539, in Dillenburg – 28 May 1599, in Kasteel Ulft), Countess of Nassau, Katzenelnbogen, Vianden and Dietz, was a Dutch noblewoman.

Life
She was the second daughter of William I, Count of Nassau-Siegen and Juliana of Stolberg, making Maria a sister of William the Silent. On 11 November 1556 she married count Willem IV van den Bergh (1537–1586) in Meurs. Count Willem committed treason against his brother-in-law William by defecting to the Spanish. He and Maria were caught, but were quickly freed on William's intervention.

Maria is buried in the crypt of the church at 's-Heerenberg.

Issue
Maria and Willem IV van den Bergh had 16 children:
 Magdalena van den Bergh-'s Heerenberg (1 Aug. 1557 - 25 May 1579)
 Herman van den Bergh Count van den Bergh-'s Heerenberg ( 2 Aug. 1558 -  12 Aug. 1611)
 Frederik van den Bergh Count den Bergh-'s Heerenberg (18 Aug. 1559 - 3 Sep. 1618)
 Oswald van den Bergh (16 Jun. 1561 - 17 Jan. 1586)
 Wilhelmina van den Bergh-'s Heerenberg (7 Jul. 1562 - drowned in the IJssel near Ulft, 15 Nov. 1591)
 Elisabeth van den Bergh-'s Heerenberg (31 Dec. 1563 - 1572)
 Joost van den Bergh Count van den Bergh-'s Heerenberg (25 jan. 1565 -  8 Aug. 1600)
 Adam van den Bergh Count van den Bergh-'s Heerenberg (1568 - 7 Nov. 1590)
 Juliana van den Bergh-'s Heerenberg (1571 - drowned in the IJssel near Ulft, 15 Nov. 1591)
 Adolf van den Bergh Count van den Bergh-'s Heerenberg (1572 - 25 May 1609)
 Lodewijk van den Bergh Count van den Bergh-'s Heerenberg (1 Nov. 1572 - 10 .Jun 1592)
 Hendrik van den Bergh Count van den Bergh-'s Heerenberg, Lord of Stevensweerd en Stadhouder of Gelre (1573 - 12 May 1638)
 Catharina van den Bergh-'s Heerenberg (1578 - 19 Oct. 1640). She married Floris II of Pallandt 2nd Count of Culemborg (1601) 
 Anna van den Bergh-'s Heerenberg (1579 - 17 Aug 1630)
 Elisabeth van den Bergh-'s Heerenberg princess-abdes of Essen (1581 - 12 Jan 1614)
 Charlotte van den Bergh-'s Heerenberg (1582 - 2 Nov 1631)

Maria
Dutch people of the Eighty Years' War (Spanish Empire)
Dutch people of the Eighty Years' War (United Provinces)
1539 births
1599 deaths
Maria
Daughters of monarchs